Pol Duwez (11 December 1907 – 31 December 1984) was a Belgian-born materials scientist. While working at Caltech in 1960, he first introduced metallic glasses made through rapid liquid cooling using a technique known as splat quenching.

References

1907 births
1984 deaths
Belgian physicists
Fellows of the Minerals, Metals & Materials Society
Belgian emigrants to the United States
Members of the United States National Academy of Sciences